Potempa may refer to:

 Potempa (surname)
 Potempa murder of 1932
 Potępa, village in Silesian Voivodeship, southern Poland